Uncommon Sense with Saloni is a 2020 Indian comedy show that premiered on SonyLIV on 5 November 2020. It was directed by Prem Mistry and Sachin Negi, starring Saloni Gaur, Shubham Gaur, Jasmeet Singh Bhatia, Sachin Negi and Badri Chavan. Saloni Gaur, commonly known by her comic name Nazma Aapi, is a contemporary comedian and impressionist. She marked her web series debut with this show.

Cast

Episodes

Season 1

Reception

Critical reviews 
The show has received mixed reviews.

A reviewer for Film Companion criticized the show for being "Too Silly For The Serious Topic It Wants To Discuss". She added "For the show to work, it either needs much sharper writing or a full-blown commitment to silliness without the baggage of an ‘issue’ to discuss."

Tatsam Mukherjee of Firstpost said "The first episode of Uncommon Sense with Saloni is well... adequate, also served with a segment featuring Nazma Aapi, Gaur's most popular avatar. In a time, when there are no such shows (barring Kamra's) maybe we should be thankful for this one. It might improve in the episodes to come."

The show received a rating of 6.6/10 on Digit (magazine).

Controversy 
Bollywood actress Kangana Ranaut lashed out at Saloni for mimicking her.

References

External links 

 

Comedy web series
Hindi-language web series
SonyLIV original films